Nanjaiah Honganuru, is a Kannada folklorist in Karnataka state, India, where he is Professor of Folklore at Mysore University.

His books on folklore include Samagra Kannada Gadegalu (as an editor), Janapada Dasa Sampradaaya and Jaanapada Siri.
Dr. Nanjaih presided the chair  at the 1st "Jaanapada Mahasammelana" held in Chamarajanagara in 2017.

Books
Honganuru’s books include:
 Jaanapada Mattu Chalanasheelathe (research works)
 Jaanapada siri
 Sthalanamagalu
 Janapada dasa sampradaya
 B. Rachaiah avara jeevana matthu rajaneethi
 Samagra Kannada Gadegalu(As an editor)

Articles
His articles include:

 "Sthalanamagalu" ,1997
 "T. Narasipura Thalokina Sthalanamagalu", 1998
 "Honganurina Shishuprasagalu", 1999
 "Gundlupet Parisarada Sthalanamagalu", 2000
 "Janapada Dasa Sampradaaya", 2003
 "Badalavaneyatha Halligalu", 2005
 "Gramina Samskriti Indu mattu Naale", Janapada Karnataka No-1, Vol-4, Prasaranga, Kannada University, Hampi,2005
 "Saaraswatha Tapaswi : Ondu Sthula Parichaya", Appeared in VIDVANMANI - Felicitation Volume of Vidwan M. Shivakumaraswamy Mysore, 1999
 "Janapada Drishti : Maagi", Bahujana Karnataka Vaara Pathrike Sanchike -2, 2001
 "Mysore Jilleya Mata Manyagalu", Prajamatha Mysore Jilleya Visheshanka

References

Living people
Indian folklorists
1970 births

People from Chamarajanagar district